Martin Howard Solomon (August 12, 1927 – January 8, 2022) was an American businessman who was a partner at Hildred Capital Partners and the head of Forest Laboratories, a pharmaceutical company. He was also the father of novelist and writer Andrew Solomon, and David Solomon, his partner at Hildred Capital.

Life and career
Solomon was born on August 17, 1927, and grew up in The Bronx, New York. His father, a Jewish immigrant from Romania, made neckties from dress remnants. Around age 11, while visiting a friend’s home, he heard opera recordings. He was inspired to take piano lessons and found a job selling librettos in the lobby of the Metropolitan Opera.

He died at his home in Bedford Hills, New York, on January 8, 2022, at the age of 94.

References

1927 births
2022 deaths
American people of Romanian-Jewish descent
People from Bedford Hills, New York
People from the Bronx
Businesspeople from New York City